Kang Kyung-min (born 8 November 1996) is a South Korean handball player who represents South Korean national team. She made her Olympic debut representing South Korea at the 2020 Summer Olympics.

Career 
She represented South Korea at the 2014 Summer Youth Olympics and was part of the South Korean team which defeated Russia 32-31 in the final to claim the gold medal in the girls handball tournament. She was awarded the Most Valuable Player in Handball Korea League for 2019/20 and 2020/21 season for her consistent performances.

She was included in the South Korean squad in the women's handball competition for the 2020 Summer Olympics.

References 

1996 births
Living people
South Korean female handball players
Handball players at the 2014 Summer Youth Olympics
Youth Olympic gold medalists for South Korea
Handball players at the 2020 Summer Olympics
Olympic handball players of South Korea
Sportspeople from Incheon
20th-century South Korean women
21st-century South Korean women